American hip hop duo Twiztid, formed by and consisting of Michigan rappers Jamie "Madrox" Spaniolo and Paul "Monoxide" Methric, have released 16 full-length studio albums, 14 extended plays, and two mixtapes. Since their 1997 debut on Insane Clown Posse's Psychopathic Records label, the group have garnered a major cult following, providing guest appearances on numerous Psychopathic releases over their decade in the music industry, as well as joining fellow Psychopathic artists on the label's compilations and forming the supergroups Psychopathic Rydas and Dark Lotus.

Twiztid left Psychopathic Records on December 12, 2012, and was announced by both ICP and Twiztid via Twitter and was reported via Faygoluvers. On September 12, 2014, INgrooves announced that Twiztid had formed the Majik Ninja Entertainment label.

Albums

Studio albums

Compilation albums

Extended plays

Mixtapes

Singles

Non-album singles

Music videos

Guest appearances

Original contributions to compilations 
Psychopathic Sampler (1998) - "Whatthefuck"
Phat or Wack Sampler (1998) - Mostasteless Snippets
Psychopathics from Outer Space (2000) - "The Dirt Ball", "Murder, Murder, Murder", "Blam!", "She Ain't Afraid", "Red Neck Hoe '99", "Somebody's Dissin' U", "Old School Pervert", "Meat Cleaver"
Juggalo Show Box Set (2001) - many skits and songs
Hatchet History (2002) - "Second Hand Smoke", "Your The Reason", "Different"
Big Money Hustlas Soundstrack (2002) - "Bury Me Alive", "Rock The Dead", "Spin The Bottle"
Psychopathics from Outer Space 2 (2003) - "Hollywood, I'm Coming", "Demon Faces", "Yuwannahoe", "Free Studio"
Gathering of The Juggalos EP (2005) - "Whatever It Takes"
Psychopathics from Outer Space 3 (2007) - "My Addiction", "Zombie", "Hatchet Man"
Psychopathic Sampler (2012) - "We Dont Die", "Woe Woe", "My Addictions"
Psychopathic Psypher EP (2013) - all songs

Collaboration albums

References

Hip hop discographies
Discographies of American artists
Rap rock discographies